Burton Road Hospital was a National Health Service hospital situated in Dudley, West Midlands, England.

History
The hospital has its origins in the infirmary for the Dudley Union Workhouse which was built to the west of the main workhouse site in the 19th century. The workhouse was converted into a hospital and, in the late 1920s, it became known as the Dudley Institution. Additions to the institution at that time included a maternity hospital which was completed in 1926 and which was re-named the Rosemary Ednam Maternity Hospital in memory of Lady Ednam who had died in an air crash in July 1930.

A donation by the Rotary Club enabled Burton Road Hospital to receive the country's first mobile cardiac unit in 1971. The maternity unit continued to provide maternity services to the local area until they were transferred to a new 118-bed maternity unit at the Wordsley Hospital in the late 1980s. Following the transfer of the remaining services to Russells Hall Hospital and Bushey Fields Hospital, the hospital closed in December 1993 and the site has since been redeveloped for housing.

Notes

References

External links
Image of the hospital in 1989

Buildings and structures in Dudley
Defunct hospitals in England
Hospitals disestablished in 1993